WHATS'ON is a professional scheduling software package for broadcasting and media companies, created by the Belgian company MEDIAGENIX. CEO of this company is Fabrice Macquignon (since 2020).

History
The software was first created for the Vlaamse Televisie Maatschappij in 1992 as a scheduling system for linear TV.

Features
In 1999 the system was extended to include radio scheduling. Version 20 of the package includes video on demand, video streaming, podcasting and theme channel support. WHATS'ON includes support for revenue share licence agreements and it introduces the first fully embedded workflow engine that will further optimize the data flow between Digital asset management systems, play-out suites and finance systems. It cannot be modified.

Market
The scheduling software is in use by public broadcasters such as Danish radio, beIN Sports, NRK, RTBF, TG4, Vlaamse Radio- en Televisieomroep, Netherlands Public Broadcasting as well as by private broadcasters, including TV 2 (Denmark), TVN (Poland) and a number of stations from the SBS Broadcasting Group.

In total more than 400 channels in more than 18 countries are managed by WHATS’ON.

WideOrbit distributes WHATS'ON in the USA.

External links
MEDIAGENIX Homepage
WideOrbit Homepage

References

Business software